Adela may refer to:   

 Adela, a 1933 Romanian novel by Garabet Ibrăileanu
 Adela (1985 film), a 1985 Romanian film directed by Mircea Veroiu
 Adela (2000 film), a 2000 Argentine thriller film directed and written by Eduardo Mignogna
 Adela (2008 film), a 2008 Philippine film
 Adela (moth), a genus of fairy longhorn moths
 Adela (name), a female given name (including a list of people with the name)
 La Adela, village and rural locality (municipality) in La Pampa Province in Argentina
 USS Adela, a steamer captured by the Union Navy during the American Civil War
 Adela (brig), a ship launched in 1862
 Adela Investment Company, a private investment corporation created by multinational companies to promote economical development in Latin America and the Caribbean

See also
 Adel (disambiguation)
 Adele (disambiguation)
 Adell (disambiguation)
 Adelia (disambiguation)

cs:Adéla (rozcestník)